A Fantástica Fábrica de Cadáver (The Fantastic Corpse Factory) is the debut album by Brazilian rapper Eduardo, the album was released on December 20, 2014, with double format and contains 32 tracks. Rolling Stone magazine highlighted the unpublished song "A Fantástica Fábrica de Cadáver," which reached 14th place. The album was in 6th place as one of the best albums of the year 2014.

Track listing

References

2014 debut albums
Eduardo (rapper) albums